John Wattilete (born Johannes Gerardus (John) Wattilete in Bemmel, Gelderland, Netherlands, January 25, 1955) is the fifth and incumbent president in exile of the Republic of South Maluku (or South Moluccas, RMS) and has been in office since 2010. He was preceded by Frans Tutuhatunewa.

Biography
Wattilete was born in the Netherlands to a South Moluccan father and a Dutch mother. He grew up in Bemmel and studied law in the Catholic University of Nijmegen (now renamed Radboud University Nijmegen). He graduated in 1983 and became a lawyer in the Amsterdam law firm Wattilete Advocaten.

He was involved in the Moluccan youth movement Collectief '91, which found the policies of the Republic of South Maluku in exile (RMS) government too soft. At their first meeting, then-exile president Johan Manusama unexpectedly entered to hear their criticisms. Shortly thereafter, John Wattilete became his executive.

From 1995, he managed the General Affairs position within the RMS cabinet in exile. In 1999 he travelled to Indonesia twice with Reverend Otto Matulessy as an RMS delegate. They met Indonesian president B. J. Habibie and then with his successor Abdurrahman Wahid. During that period, there were great tensions in the South Moluccas between the Christians and Muslim populations of the region and as a result of the civil strife, there were many people killed and injured on both sides. The then RMS president Frans Tutuhatunewa was not so happy with these delegations spearheaded by Wattilete and  Matulessy. In retrospect, the more pragmatic Wattilete also admits that the conversations were futile and led to nothing.

Around 2003, Wattilete succeeded Pieter Thenu as Prime Minister / Vice President of the RMS. In April 2009, it was announced that President Tutuhatunewa would retire soon and that Wattilete would be a possible successor of the now 85-year-old president Tutuhatunewa. Wattilete became president of the RMS and was sworn in on 17 April 2010. Almost the entire management of the RMS consists of Moluccans who were born or were resident in the Netherlands. He made statements in an interview with the Nederlands Dagblad saying that the Moluccan people should be able to speak freely about the political future of their islands and that both the Indonesian government and the RMS government in exile should adhere to that outcome. Should the Moluccan people indicate that they no longer strive for their own state, Wattilete would be prepared to attach consequences to it, as he said. If outright independence is not desired, he opined that his government would accept autonomous status but as part of the Indonesian state for the time being (a situation similar to Aceh), with bigger say by the Moluccan people in their own Moluccas affairs.

References

1955 births
Living people
Presidents of the Republic of South Maluku
Moluccan independence activists
Indonesian politicians
People from Lingewaard